Veerasingam Ganeshasangari Yogasangari (died 19 June 1990) was a Sri Lankan Tamil militant, politician and Member of Parliament.

Yogasangari was the son of V. Ganeshasangaree, brother of Tamil United Liberation Front politician V. Anandasangaree.

Yogasangari contested the 1989 parliamentary election as one of the Eelam People's Revolutionary Liberation Front's candidates in Jaffna District and was elected to Parliament.

Yogasangari and other senior members of the EPRLF were assassinated on 19 June 1990 in Kodambakam, Madras, India. The assassination was blamed on the rival rebel Liberation Tigers of Tamil Eelam.

References

1990 deaths
Eelam People's Revolutionary Liberation Front militants
Eelam People's Revolutionary Liberation Front politicians
Members of the 9th Parliament of Sri Lanka
Assassinated Sri Lankan politicians
People from Northern Province, Sri Lanka
People killed during the Sri Lankan Civil War
Sri Lankan Tamil politicians
Sri Lankan Tamil rebels
Year of birth missing
Sri Lankan expatriates in India